The  is the 4th edition of the Japan Film Professional Awards. It awarded the best of 1994 in film. The ceremony took place on April 15, 1995, at Theatre Shinjuku in Tokyo.

Awards 
Best Film: Kyōjū Luger P08
Best Director: Takeshi Watanabe (Kyōjū Luger P08, Goku Tsubushi)
Best Actress: Sawa Suzuki (Ai no Shinsekai)
Best Actor: Etsushi Toyokawa (Undo, Angel Dust)
Best New Director: Shunji Iwai (Undo)
Special: Hiroshi Abe (Kyōjū Luger P08, Ōsaka Gokudō Sensō Shinoidare)
Special: Eriko Watanabe (Crest of Betrayal, Kowagaru Hitobito)
Best New Encouragement: Isao Ishii (For filming Tokarev.)

10 best films
 Kyōjū Luger P08 (Takeshi Watanabe)
 Nobody (Toshimichi Ōkawa)
 Undo (Shunji Iwai)
 Totsuzen Honoo no Gotoku (Kazuyuki Izutsu)
 Shoot! (Kazuki Ōmori)
 Ai no Shinsekai (Banmei Takahashi)
 Yoru ga Mata Kuru (Takashi Ishii)
 Koi no Tasogare (Takayoshi Yamaguchi)
 Watcher in the Attic (Akio Jissoji)
 Ōsaka Gokudō Sensō Shinoidare (Tatsuoki Hosono)

References

External links
  

Japan Film Professional Awards
1995 in Japanese cinema
Japan Film Professional Awards
April 1995 events in Asia